Venkatesh Rao (born 16 June 1939) is an Indian former cricketer. He played 56 first-class matches for Hyderabad between 1955 and 1968.

See also
 List of Hyderabad cricketers

References

External links
 

1939 births
Living people
Indian cricketers
Hyderabad cricketers
Cricketers from Chennai